Emona is a village and seaside resort in southeast Bulgaria, situated in the Nesebar Municipality of the Burgas Province. The beach Irakli is 5 km from Emona. Emona lies close to Cape Emine. There are ruins of the ancient fortress nearby.

Emona is famous for being the birthplace of Thracian king Rhesus, who fought in the Trojan War. According to Homer's Iliad, he was killed by Odysseus and Diomedes.

Villages in Burgas Province
Seaside resorts in Bulgaria
Populated coastal places in Bulgaria